Jarmo Eskelinen (born 17 May 1962) is a Finnish boxer. He competed at the 1984 Summer Olympics and the 1988 Summer Olympics.

References

External links
 

1962 births
Living people
Finnish male boxers
Olympic boxers of Finland
Boxers at the 1984 Summer Olympics
Boxers at the 1988 Summer Olympics
People from Kajaani
Bantamweight boxers
Sportspeople from Kainuu